Alkefjellet is a cliff in Lomfjordhalvøya in Ny-Friesland at Spitsbergen, Svalbard. Alkefjellet is a bird cliff facing towards Hinlopen Strait.

References

Seabird colonies
Tourist attractions in Svalbard
Mountains of Spitsbergen